The Foolish Age is a 1921 American silent comedy film directed by William A. Seiter and starring Doris May, Hallam Cooley and Otis Harlan.

Cast
 Doris May as Margie Carr
 Hallam Cooley as Homer Dean Chadwick
 Otis Harlan as Old Top: Carr
 Arthur Hoyt as Lester Hicks
 Lillian Worth as Flossy
 Bull Montana as Bubbs
 William Elmer as Cauliflower Jim
 W.C. Robinson as Todd

References

Bibliography
 Munden, Kenneth White. The American Film Institute Catalog of Motion Pictures Produced in the United States, Part 1. University of California Press, 1997.

External links
 

1921 films
1921 comedy films
1920s English-language films
American silent feature films
Silent American comedy films
American black-and-white films
Films directed by William A. Seiter
Film Booking Offices of America films
1920s American films